Geoffrey or Geoff Campbell may refer to:
 Geoff Campbell, Home and Away character
 Geoffrey Campbell, Chair of DRDGOLD Limited
 Geoffrey Campbell, killed in The Troubles in Newry

See also
 Jeff Campbell (disambiguation)
 Geoffrey Campbell Gunter (1879–1961), Jamaican governor